2,5-Xylidine is an organic compound with the formula C6H3(CH3)2NH2. It is one of several isomeric xylidines.  It is a colorless viscous liquid.  Commercially significant derivatives include Solvent Yellow 30, Solvent Red 22, Acid Red 65, and Solvent Red 26.

Production
Like many xylidines, it is prepared by nitration of the corresponding xylene followed by reduction of the nitroxylene.  Reduction can be effected with HCl/Fe, but usually is achieved by catalytic hydrogenation:
Me2C6H4  +  HNO3   →   Me2C6H3NO2  +  H2O
Me2C6H3NO2  +  3 H2   →   Me2C6H3NH2  +  3H2O

Safety
It is mutagenic and tumor-inducing.  Acute toxicity of xylidines is modest as indicated by LD50 (rats, oral) are in the range 0.1-1 g/kg.

References

Anilines